John Crosbie (John Carnell Crosbie; 1931–2020) is a retired Canadian politician.

John Crosbie may also refer to:
 John Crosbie (bishop) (died 1621), Irish bishop
 John Gustavus Crosbie (died 1797), Irish MP
 John Crosbie, 2nd Earl of Glandore (1753–1815), Irish politician
 Sir John Chalker Crosbie (1876–1932), Newfoundland politician
 Johnny Crosbie (1896–1982), Scottish footballer with Ayr United, Birmingham City, Scotland

See also
 John Crosby (disambiguation)